The Wild Ones is the fourth album by the band Cockney Rejects released in 1982.

Track listing 

 "Way of the Rocker"
 "City of the Lights"
 "Rock N' Roll Dream"
 "Till the End of the Day"
 "Some Play Dirty"
 "Satellite City"
 "Let Me Rock You"
 "Victim of the Cheap Wine"
 "Hells a Long Way to Go"
 "Heat of the Night"

All song written by Cockney Rejects except Till the End of the Day, written by Ray Davies

Personnel 
Vinnie Riordan - Bass
Keith Warrington - Drums
Micky Geggus - Guitar
Jefferson Turner - Vocals

References

1982 albums
Cockney Rejects albums